Ekkasit Chaobut (Thai:เอกสิทธิ์ ฉาวบุตร), is a Thai footballer who currently plays for Sukhothai in Thai League 1.

References

http://us.soccerway.com/players/ekasit-chaobut/291176/

1991 births
Living people
Ekkasit Chaobut
Ekkasit Chaobut
Ekkasit Chaobut
Ekkasit Chaobut
Ekkasit Chaobut
Ekkasit Chaobut
Ekkasit Chaobut
Association football defenders
Ekkasit Chaobut
Ekkasit Chaobut